Conformal coating is a protective coating of thin polymeric film applied to printed circuit boards (PCB). The coating is named conformal since it conforms to the contours of the PCB. Conformal coatings are typically applied at 25-250 μm to the electronic circuitry and provides protection against moisture, dust, chemicals and temperature extremities.

Coatings can be applied in a number of ways including brushing, spraying, dispensing and dip coating. A number of materials can be used as a conformal coating such as acrylics, silicones, urethanes and parylene. Each has their own characteristics, making them preferred for certain environments and manufacturing scenarios. Most circuit board assembly firms coat assemblies with a layer of transparent conformal coating, which is lighter and easier to inspect than potting.

Reasons for use
Conformal coatings are used to protect electronic components from the environmental factors they are exposed to. Examples of these factors include moisture, dust, salt, chemicals, temperature changes and mechanical abrasion. Successful conformal coating will prevent the board from corroding. More recently, conformal coatings are being used to reduce the formation of whiskers, and can also prevent current bleed between closely positioned components.

Conformal coatings are breathable, allowing trapped moisture in electronic boards to escape while maintaining protection from contamination. These coatings are not sealants, and prolonged exposure to vapors will cause transmission and degradation to occur. There are typically four classes of conformal coatings: Acrylic, Urethane, Silicone, and Varnish. While each has its own specific physical and chemical properties each are able to perform the following functions:

 Insulation: Allowing closer conductor spacing
 Eliminate the need for complex enclosures
 Minimal effect on component weight
 Completely protect the assembly against chemical and corrosive attack
 Eliminate performance degradation due to environmental hazards
 Minimize environmental stress on a PCB assembly

Applications 

Precision analog circuitry may suffer degraded accuracy if insulating surfaces become contaminated with ionic substances such as fingerprint residues, which can become weakly conductive in the presence of moisture. (The classic symptom of micro-contamination on an analog circuit board is sudden changes in performance at high humidity, for example, when a technician breathes on it). A suitably chosen material coating can reduce the effects of mechanical stress and vibrations on the circuit and its ability to perform in extreme temperatures.

For example, in a chip-on-board assembly process, a silicon die is mounted on the board with an adhesive or a soldering process, then electrically connected by wire bonding, typically with .001-inch-diameter gold or aluminum wire. The chip and the wire are delicate, so they are encapsulated in a version of conformal coating called "glob top." This prevents accidental contact from damaging the wires or the chip. Another use of conformal coating is to increase the voltage rating of a dense circuit assembly. An insulating coating can withstand a much stronger electric field than air, particularly at high altitude.

With the exception of Parylene, most organic coatings are readily penetrated by water molecules. A coating preserves the performance of electronics primarily by preventing ionizable contaminants such as salts from reaching circuit nodes, and combining there with water to form a microscopically thin electrolyte film. For this reason, coating is far more effective if all surface contamination is removed first, using a highly repeatable industrial process such as vapor degreasing or semi-aqueous washing. Extreme cleanliness also improves adhesion. Pinholes defeat the purpose of the coating, because a contaminant film would make contact with circuit nodes and form undesired conductive paths.

Coating application methods 
The coating material can be applied by various methods, including brushing, spraying, dipping or selectively coating by robots. Different methods of curing and drying are available depending on the conformal coating material. Nearly all modern conformal coatings contain a fluorescent dye to aid in coating coverage inspection.

Brush coating
This works by flow coating the material onto the board and is suitable for low volume application, finishing and repair. The finish tends to be cosmetically inferior and can be subject to many defects such as bubbles. The coating also tends to be thicker unless skilled operators apply the coating.

Spray application coating

This coating can be completed with a spray aerosol or dedicated spray booth with spray gun and is suitable for low and medium volume processing. The quality of the surface finish can be superior to all other methods when a skilled operator completes the process, provided that the circuit board is clean and the coating has no adhesion problems. The coating application may be limited due to 3D effects. Masking requirements are more of a shield nature rather than a barrier, since there is less penetration. The lack of penetration can be a problem where the coating is desired to penetrate beneath devices.

Spray application can be one of the most cost-effective ways of applying conformal coating, as it can be done on the bench top for small rework and repair jobs. This method can be done in spray booths for medium scale production.

One of the key attributes of atomised spraying is giving excellent tip coverage to components. When conformal coatings are applied to a PCB they have a tendency to slump. The first layer of a coating can give a thin edge on the corner of components. This can be improved with a second coat by double dipping or brushing, but this is a repeat process and may not be acceptable. To eliminate this problem atomised spraying can be used.

Conformal coating dipping

This coating is a highly repeatable process. If the printed circuit board (PCB) is designed correctly, it can be the highest volume technique. The coating penetrates everywhere, including beneath devices, hence masking must be perfect to prevent leakage. Therefore, many PCBs are unsuitable for dipping due to design.

The issue of thin tip coverage where the material slumps around sharp edges can be a problem, especially in a condensing atmosphere. This tip coverage effect can be eliminated by either double dipping the PCB or using several thin layers of atomised spraying to achieve good coverage without exceeding coating thickness recommendations. A combination of the two techniques may also be used.

Selective coating by machine 
This method is the best choice for high volume applications. It is a fast and accurate way of applying the coating to the exact areas of the board where it is required.

It works by using a needle and atomised spray applicator, non-atomised spray or ultrasonic valve technologies that can move above the circuit board and dispense / spray the coating material in select areas. Flow rates and material viscosity are programmed into the computer system controlling the applicator so that the desired coating thickness is maintained. This method is effective for large volumes, provided that the PCBs are designed for the method. There are limitations in the select coat process like the other processes, such as capillary effects around low profile connectors which suck up the coating accidentally. A skilled operator is required.

The process quality of dip or dam-and-fill coating and non-atomised spray technology can be improved by applying then releasing a vacuum while the assembly is submerged in the liquid resin. This forces the liquid resin into all crevices, eliminating uncoated surfaces in interior cavities.

The differences in application methods can be seen in a comparison presentation. Choice of method is dependent on the complexity of the substrate to be coated, the required coating performance, and the throughput requirements.

Curing and drying method

Solvent and water-based conformal coatings
For standard solvent-based acrylics, air drying (film forming) is the normal process except where speed is essential. Then heat curing can be used, using batch or inline ovens with conveyors and using typical cure profiles.

Water-based conformal coatings can be treated in the same manner, but with more care in the heat application due to longer drying times.

UV conformal coatings

UV curing of conformal coatings is becoming important for high volume users in fields such as automotive and consumer electronics.

This increase in the popularity of UV curable conformal coatings is due to its rapid cure speed, ease of processing, environmental friendliness and thermal cycling resistance.

UV conformal coatings can be cured with arc, microwave lamps and UV LED lamp.

Moisture curing 
Silicone and Urethane resins get cured by this method. The moisture in the atmosphere cures the resin and forms a polymer. Boards are handled between a few minutes to an hour but take a few days to reach its final properties.

Thickness and measurement
Coating material (after curing) should have a thickness of  when using acrylic resin, epoxy resin, or urethane resin.

There are several methods for measuring coating thickness, and they fall into two categories: wet film and dry film.

Wet film conformal coating measurement

The wet film method ensures quality control while the coating is still wet.

Applying too much coating can be expensive. Also, wet film measurements are useful for conformal coatings where the dry film thickness can only be measured destructively or where over-application of conformal coating is a problem.

The wet film gauges are applied to the wet conformal coating; the teeth indicate the coating thickness. The dry film thickness can then be calculated from the measurement.

Dry film conformal coating thickness measurement

An alternative to wet film measurement is by using eddy currents. The system works by placing the test head on the surface of the conformal coating. The measurement is almost instantaneous and provides an immediate repeatable result for thickness measurement.

Test coupons are the ideal method for measuring coating thickness, and can be archived as a physical record. Apply the coating to test coupons at the same time as the circuit boards provides a permanent record of coating thickness.

Thicker coatings or better-applied coatings may be required when liquid water is present due to possible pinhole formation in the coating or when the coating is too thin on sharp edges of components due to poor application. This is considered a defect and can be eliminated with appropriate steps and training. These techniques effectively "pot" or "conform" to components by completely covering them.

Conformal coating inspection

Traditionally, conformal coating inspection has been done manually. A typical situation is an inspector sitting in a booth, examining each PCB under a high intensity long wave UV lamp. The inspector checks for proper workmanship and that standards are met.

Recent developments in conformal coating automated optical inspection (AOI) have begun to address these manual processes and issues. Automated Inspection Systems can be camera- or scanner-based, hence the technology can be matched to the project.

Conformal coating selection
The selection of conformal coating material needs to be done carefully, and in relation to the application method. Incorrect selection can affect long term reliability of the circuit board, and can cause processing and cost problems.

The most common standards for conformal coating are IPC A-610 and IPC-CC-830. These standards list indications of good and bad coverage and describe various failure mechanisms such as dewetting and orange peel.

Another type of coating called parylene is applied with a vacuum deposition process at ambient temperature. Film coatings from 0.100 to 76 μm can be applied in a single operation. The advantage of parylene coatings is that they cover hidden surfaces and other areas where spray and needle application are not possible. Coating thickness is uniform, even on irregular surfaces. Desired contact points such as battery contacts or connectors must be covered with an air-tight mask to prevent the parylene from coating the contacts. Applying parylene is a batch process which does not lend itself to high volume processing. The cost per PCB can be high due to high capital investment and the cost per batch.

Coating chemistries
There are many chemistries of conformal coatings available. It is important to choose a coating chemistry meeting the application needs. Below are five common attributes for each coating chemistry:

 Acrylic
 Ease of rework
 Simple drying process
 Good moisture resistance
 High fluorescence level
 Ease of viscosity adjustment

 Epoxy
 Useful to about 150C [302F]
 Harder durometer, abrasion resistance
 CTE closer to epoxy PCB substrate
 Higher Tg (Glass transition)
 Good dielectric properties

 Polyurethane
 Good dielectric properties
 Good moisture resistance
 Solvent resistance
 Less reversion potential
 Abrasion resistance

 Silicones
 Stable over wide temperature range (in general, -40C to 200C)[-40F to 392F]
 Flexible, provides dampening and impact protection
 Good moisture resistance
 High dielectric strength
 Low surface energy for better wetting

 Fluorinated or non Fluorinated - Poly-Para-Xylylene (Parylene)
 Excellent uniformity regardless of part geometry
 Chemical inertness
 Minimal added mass and low outgassing
 Low environmental impact process
 Low dielectric constant

 Amorphous Fluoropolymer
 Low dielectric constant
 High glass transition temperature
 Low surface energy
 Low water absorption
 Solvent resistance

The basics of conformal coating processing are found in a presentation available at:

Material considerations 

Selecting the correct coating material is one of the process engineer's most critical decisions. This criteria includes:
 What is being protected against? (e.g., moisture, chemicals)
 What temperature range will the electrical device encounter?
 What are the physical, electrical, and chemical requirements for the coating material itself?
 Electrical, chemical, and mechanical compatibility with the parts and substances to be coated (for instance, does it need to match the coefficient of expansion of chip components?)

Answers will determine the suitability of a particular material, be it acrylic, polyurethane, silicone, epoxy, etc. Process, production and commercial issues will then enter the equation:
 How easily can the material be reworked once applied?
 How fast does the material dry (cure)?
 How fast can the material be applied and dried (throughput time)?
 What type of process and equipment is necessary to achieve the required coating quality (uniformity and repeatability)?
 Price of the material.
 Quality of the material supplied (two acrylic material manufacturers will not produce equal quality of material).

References 

Printed circuit board manufacturing
Coatings